

John Burgee (born August 28, 1933) is an American architect noted for his contributions to Postmodern architecture. He was a partner of Philip Johnson from 1967 to 1991, creating together the partnership firm Johnson/Burgee Architects.  Their landmark collaborations included Pennzoil Place in Houston and the AT&T World Headquarters in New York.  Burgee eased Johnson out of the firm in 1991, and when it subsequently went bankrupt, Burgee's design career was essentially over. Burgee is retired, and resides in California.

Life and career
Burgee graduated from the School of Architecture at the University of Notre Dame in 1956, and served on the university's Board of Trustees from 1988 until 2006, when he was named trustee emeritus, and on the School of Architecture's Advisory Council from 1982. He also served on the boards of the Architectural League of New York, Lenox Hill Hospital, Columbia University's Master of Sciences Program in Real Estate Development, the Parsons School of Design, and the Friends of the Upper East Side Historic District, and was the co-chairman of the Architectural Committee of the Statue of Liberty/Ellis Island Centennial Commission. For the Institute for Architecture and Urban Studies, Burgee was president and chairman.

Johnson/Burgee Architects

John Burgee and Philip Johnson established Johnson/Burgee in Manhattan in 1968, with Burgee as the firm's CEO, and they collaborated on many designs.  In 1984, Raj Ahuja, who had been an associate with the firm for 15 years, was made a full partner. Two years later, they moved into the Lipstick Building at 885 Third Avenue, between 53rd and 54th Streets, which the firm had designed.  That same year, Burgee negotiated a lesser role in the partnership for Johnson, as a design consultant, and in 1988 he asked Ahuja to leave.  Completing the transformation of the firm, in 1991 Johnson left altogether, at Burgee's behest. Shortly thereafter, the firm went into bankruptcy because of an arbitration connected to Ahuja's leaving, and Burgee's career was dealt a serious blow.

Their collaborations include:

1969 – Master plan for Roosevelt Island in the East River, New York City 
1973 – Niagara Falls Convention Center (now Seneca Niagara Casino), Niagara Falls, New York
1973 – 49th Street BMT Subway Station (reconstruction), Manhattan, New York City
1974 – Morningside House (Reception Building and Administration and Medical Services Building), The Bronx, New York City
1974 – Fort Worth Water Gardens, Fort Worth, Texas
1974 – Neuberger Museum of Art, SUNY Purchase, Purchase, New York
1974 – Air India Building, Bombay, India
1975 – Pennzoil Place, Houston, Texas
1976 – Reconstruction of the interior of Avery Fisher Hall, Manhattan, New York City
1977 – Century Center (South Bend), South Bend, Indiana
1980 – 1001 Fifth Avenue (apartment building), Manhattan, New York City
1981 – Bank of America Center, Block 84, Houston, Texas
1983 – Williams Tower (formerly Transco Tower), Houston, Texas
1984 – PPG Place, Pittsburgh
1984 – Sony Building, Manhattan, New York City
1982 – 33 Maiden Lane, Manhattan, New York City
1983 – "Lipstick Building", 885 Third Avenue, Manhattan, New York City
1986 – The Crescent (Dallas), Dallas, Texas
1986 – Tycon Center, Fairfax County, Virginia
1987 – 190 South LaSalle Street, Chicago, Ill.; Burgee's first skyscraper in Chicago, where he was born
1987 – Comerica Bank Tower, Dallas, Texas
1984 – One Atlantic Center (IBM Building), Atlanta
1983 – 500 Boylston Street, Boston
1989 – Gate of Europe, Madrid, Spain
1989 – Museum of Television and Radio, Manhattan, New York City
1990 – 191 Peachtree Tower, Atlanta
1991 – One Detroit Center, Detroit (Ally Detroit Center)
1991 – 101 Collins Street, Melbourne, Australia
1993 – 400 West Market, Louisville, Kentucky

Awards and honors
1978: AIA Award for Pennzoil Place
1983: Honorary Doctorate in Engineering, University of Notre Dame
1984: Chicago Architecture Award, Illinois Council of the AIA (first recipient)
2004: Orlando T. Maione Award for distinguished contributions to the Notre Dame School of Architecture

See also

References
Notes

Bibliography
 Lang, Jon T. Concise History of Modern Architecture: in India. Orient Blackswan, 1 August 2002. , 9788178240176.

External links

Emporis

20th-century American architects
Postmodern architects
Notre Dame School of Architecture alumni
Living people
1933 births
Architects from Chicago
University of Notre Dame Trustees